The 1992 Limerick Senior Hurling Championship was the 98th staging of the Limerick Senior Hurling Championship since its establishment by the Limerick County Board.

Ballybrown were the defending champions.

On 27 September 1992, Kilmallock won the championship after a 1-12 to 0-12 defeat of Patrickswell in the final. It was their seventh championship title overall and their first title since 1985.

Results

Final

References

Limerick Senior Hurling Championship
Limerick Senior Hurling Championship